The 2007 Kentucky gubernatorial election was held on November 6, 2007. In this election, incumbent Republican Governor Ernie Fletcher ran for reelection to a second term, but was soundly defeated by Democratic challenger Steve Beshear. A primary election to determine the Republican and Democratic nominees for governor was held on May 22, 2007, in which Fletcher and Beshear won their respective primaries.

Background
Fletcher came under increasing criticism from both parties after his involvement in a state employee hiring controversy, in which he was accused of illegally hiring merit system (civil service) employees for their political affiliations and loyalties. An investigation by Greg Stumbo, the Attorney General of Kentucky, and a special grand jury led to the indictment of 13 Fletcher administration officials. Fletcher issued a blanket pardon for anyone in his administration (other than himself) who was or may have been involved in the scandal. Fletcher himself was later indicted by a grand jury for three misdemeanors: conspiracy, official misconduct and political discrimination. All were related to the merit-system investigation. On August 24, 2006, Fletcher reached a deal with Stumbo that led to the dismissal of the charges in exchange for Fletcher's acknowledgment that "the evidence strongly indicates wrongdoing by his administration with regard to personnel actions within the merit system. Further, the governor hereby states that these actions were inappropriate and that he regrets their occurrence and accepts responsibility for them as head of the executive branch of state government." (See Ernie Fletcher: Merit system investigation) Fletcher's approval rating as of May 11, 2007 was at 38%, putting him among the lowest governors in the nation.

Former U.S. Rep. Anne Northup, who had lost reelection in 2006, and Paducah businessman Billy Harper challenged Fletcher in the Republican primary. Both had supported and worked for Fletcher's 2003 campaign. Despite his troubles, Fletcher was able to fend off the primary challenge, winning just over a majority of the vote (see below).

On the Democratic side, an increasingly competitive primary campaign developed. Louisville businessman Bruce Lunsford spent over five million dollars, most of it being his own money, in the campaign, and picked Stumbo as his running mate for lieutenant governor. On May 7, Kentucky State Treasurer Jonathan Miller withdrew from the race and endorsed former Lt. Gov. Steve Beshear. Lunsford, Beshear, state House Speaker Jody Richards, and former Lt. Gov. Steve Henry consistently polled significantly ahead of the other candidates. Given the crowded field, many believed a runoff election was likely between the top two finishers — which polls suggested would be Beshear and Lunsford — if no candidate was able to obtain at least 40% of the vote. Beshear, however, was able to avoid a runoff with 41% (see below).

Democratic primary

Candidates
Steve Beshear – former Lt. Governor of Kentucky, 1983–1987; former Attorney General of Kentucky, 1979–1983; former State Representative, 1974–1979.
Running mate: State Senator Daniel Mongiardo, 2001–2007.

Gatewood Galbraith – Attorney, Legalization of Marijuana and Industrial Hemp Advocate
Running mate: Mark Wireman

Steve Henry – former Lt. Governor of Kentucky, 1995–2003
Running Mate: Fayette County Property Valuation Administrator Renee True, 1992-present

Otis Hensley – Private contractor from Wallins Creek, Kentucky who received 3% of the vote in the Democratic primary in 2003.
Running mate: Richard Robbins

Bruce Lunsford – prominent Louisville businessman; sought the Democratic nomination for Governor in 2003; withdrew four days before the primary, endorsing Jody Richards.
Running mate: Greg Stumbo, Attorney General of Kentucky 2004–2007; former State Representative, 1985–2003.

Jody Richards – State Representative, 1975–present (Speaker of the House, 1996–2007); received 47% of the vote in the Democratic primary for Governor of Kentucky in 2003.
Running mate: John Y. Brown III, Kentucky Secretary of State 1995–2003.

Polling

Results

Republican primary

Candidates
Ernie Fletcher – Incumbent Governor of Kentucky, 2003–present; former U.S. Representative for Kentucky's 6th congressional district, 1999–2003; former State Representative, 1995–1997
Running mate: Robbie Rudolph, State Secretary of Executive Cabinet, 2006–2007; State Secretary of Finance, 2003–2006.

Billy Harper – Businessman
Running mate: Dick Wilson.

Anne Northup – former U.S. Representative for Kentucky's 3rd congressional district, 1997–2007; former State Representative, 1987–1997.
Running mate: Jeff Hoover, State Representative 1997–present.

Polling

Results

General election

Polling

Results

Fletcher conceded to Beshear at 9:00 PM on November 6.

See also
 2007 United States elections
 2007 United States gubernatorial elections
 State of Kentucky
 Governors of Kentucky
 BluegrassReport.org—Kentucky politics blog run during Gov. Fletcher's administration

References

External links
Candidates
Steve Beshear for Governor (Archive)
Ernie Fletcher for Governor (Archive)
Information
Kentucky Secretary of State Filing Report
Louisville Courier-Journal recap of Democratic primary
Louisville Courier-Journal recap of Republican primary
Unofficial Election results (live returns)

Governor
2007
2007 United States gubernatorial elections
November 2007 events in the United States